Hemilienardia bicolor is a species of sea snail, a marine gastropod mollusk in the family Raphitomidae.

Description
The length of the shell attains 5.2 mm.

Distribution
This marine species is endemic to Davao, Mindanao, the Philippines.

References

 Bozzetti L. (2018). Hemilienardia bicolor (Gastropoda: Neogastropoda: Raphitomidae) nuova specie dalle Filippine. Malacologia Mostra Mondiale. 99: 3-4

bicolor
Gastropods described in 2018